Anacheirurus is a genus of trilobites. It was described by Reed in 1896, as a new genus for the species Cheirurus frederici, and was originally described by Salter in 1864.

Species
 Anacheirurus asiaticus Petrunina, 1984
 Anacheirurus bohemicus (Ruzicka, 1926)
 Anacheirurus frederici (Salter, 1864)
 Anacheirurus plutonis Rushton, 1973
 Anacheirurus atecae Hamman, 1971

External links
 Anacheirurus at the Paleobiology Database

Fossils of Great Britain
Pilekiidae
Phacopida genera
Fossil taxa described in 1896
Fezouata Formation fossils